WQRM (850 AM) is a radio station broadcasting a Conservative Christian radio format. Licensed to Duluth, Minnesota, United States, the station is an owned and operated affiliate of VCY America.

History
The station began broadcasting on April 26, 1963, and held the call sign WWJC. The station was originally owned by Twin Ports Christian Broadcasting Corporation. It originally broadcast at 1270 kHz and ran 5,000 watts. Its original city of license was Superior, Wisconsin. In 1970, its frequency was changed to 850 kHz, its power was increased to 10,000 watts, and its city of license was changed to Duluth, Minnesota.

In 2014, the station was sold to VCY America for $400,000. In 2016, WQRM was granted a license to increase daytime power to 50,000 watts, with critical hours service of 14,000 watts.

On August 8, 2021, WQRM was the victim of a fire that totally destroyed the new transmitter as well as the backup transmitters. The fire caused over $500,000 in damage to the transmitter and other equipment, and $75,000 in structural damage.

References

External links

Christian radio stations in Minnesota
Radio stations established in 1963
1963 establishments in Minnesota
Daytime-only radio stations in Minnesota
VCY America stations